The 2018 Prairie View A&M Panthers football team represented Prairie View A&M University in the 2018 NCAA Division I FCS football season. The Panthers were led by first-year head coach Eric Dooley and played their home games at Panther Stadium at Blackshear Field in Prairie View, Texas as members of the West Division of the Southwestern Athletic Conference (SWAC).

Previous season
The Panthers finished the 2017 season 6–5, 4–3 in SWAC play to finish in third place in the West Division.

On December 9, head coach Willie Simmons resigned to become the head coach at Florida A&M He finished at PVA&M with a three-year record of 21–11.

Preseason

SWAC football media day
During the SWAC football media day held in Birmingham, Alabama on July 13, 2018, the Panthers were predicted to finish third in the West Division.

Media poll

Presason All-SWAC Team
The Panthers had seven players selected to Preseason All-SWAC Teams.

Offense
1st team

Corbin Finlayson – Sr. OL

2nd team

Dawonya Tucker – Sr. RB

Roderick Smith – Sr. OL

Markcus Hardy – Sr. WR

Zarrian Holcombe – Sr. TE

Defense
1st team

Ju’Anthony Parker – Sr. DB

2nd team

Reggie Stubblefield – Sr. DB

Schedule

Game summaries

at Rice

vs North Carolina Central

at Sam Houston State

at UNLV

at Arkansas–Pine Bluff

vs Grambling State

Southern

Alcorn State

at Jackson State

Alabama State

Texas Southern

Players drafted into the NFL

References

Prairie View AandM
Prairie View A&M Panthers football seasons
Prairie View AandM Panthers football